Uncle John may refer to:

 Uncle John (film), a 2015 American thriller film
 Uncle John's (store), a Philippine convenience store chain
 Uncle John's Bathroom Reader, a series of books containing trivia and short essays on miscellaneous topics
 John McCarthy (computer scientist) (1927–2011), computer scientist known as "Uncle John"

 Uncle John an Indian ice cream brand founded by George Verghese